Yvan Delsarte (31 May 1929 – 11 June 2019) was a Belgian basketball player. He competed in the men's tournament at the 1952 Summer Olympics.

References

1929 births
2019 deaths
Belgian men's basketball players
Olympic basketball players of Belgium
Basketball players at the 1952 Summer Olympics
Sportspeople from Hainaut (province)